Unreformed boroughs were those corporate towns in England and Wales which had not been reformed by the Municipal Corporations Act 1835. A handful of these obtained new charters under the 1835 Act.  A royal commission was established in 1876 to inquire into these boroughs, and legislation passed in 1883 finally forced the reform or dissolution of these corporations by 1886.

Boroughs reformed 1835–1881
Only nine unreformed boroughs obtained new charters under the 1835 Act:

Three other towns incorporated in this period are sometimes listed as unreformed boroughs. The first of these was Ashton-under-Lyne, Lancashire, incorporated in 1847. Although it may have had an existence as a municipality, it had ceased to exist by the nineteenth century. Peterborough, in Northamptonshire and Huntingdonshire, was incorporated in 1874. The town was governed by officials of the dean and diocese of Peterborough.  Taunton, in Somerset, whose charter had been nullified in 1792 due to a failure to fill vacancies in the corporation, continued as a parliamentary borough and the town was incorporated as a municipal borough in 1877.

The Royal Commission of 1876
A royal commission was appointed in 1876 which investigated the unreformed boroughs and made recommendations on which towns might be brought under the Municipal Corporations Act.  The commissioners identified 75 towns with corporations still functioning, and recommended that 26 of them should be reformed, the others being abolished. They also named a further 32 towns in which the corporation had become extinct, although the boroughs still had a legal existence. Of these, 10 had ceased to operate since 1835. 
The commissioners’ report was not acted upon for seven years.  In the meantime, one of the towns they considered suitable for municipal government, Lewes was reformed, and the 1835 legislation was replaced by the Municipal Corporations Act 1882.

Municipal Corporations Act 1883
The Municipal Corporations Act 1883 provided for the abolition of unreformed borough corporations, unless they obtained a new charter under the 1882 legislation.

Section 3 stated that “The place shall not be a corporate town or borough, and any municipal or other corporation thereof existing shall be dissolved” if a new charter had not been obtained by 29 September 1886.

The first and second schedules listed the corporations investigated by the 1876 commission. The successors are municipal boroughs, local government districts, rural sanitary districts and improvement commissioners districts.

A number of the boroughs abolished in 1886 subsequently regained borough status, the earliest being Cowbridge in 1887. When such boroughs were created, however, they were entirely new creations with no claim to the former property of the abolished boroughs.

Other provisions
The 1886 Act also dealt with a number of other corporations with a status similar to boroughs:
The Confederation of the Cinque Ports were to retain their privileges in those towns with a reformed corporation. Non-corporate members were to be merged with the county and hundred in which they lay geographically. The corporation of the ancient town of Winchelsea was to become a charitable trust.
The corporation of the bailiff jurats and commonalty of Romney Marsh was to continue to exist, but would only exercise such non-municipal powers.
The Liberties Act 1850 would be extended to the Liberty of Havering atte Bower, allowing for its merger with the county of Essex.

References

Sources

Citations

Local government in the United Kingdom
Boroughs of the United Kingdom